Johan Andersen may refer to:

Johan Andersen (politician) (1902–1968), Norwegian politician for the Labour Party
Johan Andersen (canoeist) (1920–2003), Danish Olympic flatwater canoer
Jesse Anderson (Yu-Gi-Oh! GX), a fictional character in the anime series Yu-Gi-Oh! GX
Johan Vilhelm Andersen (1892–1971), Danish painter

See also
Johan Anderson (born 1971), former Australian tennis player
Johan Andersson (disambiguation)